

National teams

Denmark women's national football team

Friendlies and qualifications

Domestic results

Women's football

2015–16 Elitedivisionen

Championship round

References

Seasons in Danish football